Typical conebills belong to the tanager genus Conirostrum. They are small tanagers (9–14 cm) found in the forests of South America. They feed in pairs or small flocks by gleaning insects from foliage.

The genus consists of two rather distinct subgenera: The first, Ateleodacnis, possibly deserving full generic status, is confined to lowland areas. They are mostly grey in colour and inhabit deciduous woodlands, mangroves or riverbank habitats. The second group, the nominate Conirostrum subgenus, inhabits the forests of the Andes. They are somewhat more colourful combining grey or blue backs with rufous underparts. 
Their thin bills led to them being formerly classified as wood-warblers or honeycreepers but genetic data places them in the tanager family Thraupidae.

Taxonomy and species list
The genus Conirostrum was introduced in 1838 by the French naturalists Alcide d'Orbigny and Frédéric de Lafresnaye with the cinereous conebill (Conirostrum cinereum) as the type species. The genus name combines the Latin conus meaning "cone" and rostrum meaning "bill". There are now 11 species placed in the genus.

References

 
Bird genera